Mokry Dwór  (meaning "wet manor") is a village in the administrative district of Gmina Siechnice, within Wrocław County, Lower Silesian Voivodeship, in south-western Poland.

The village has a population of 380.

References

Villages in Wrocław County